 

Mireille Lebel is a Canadian-born mezzo-soprano opera singer based in Berlin, Germany.

Biography 
Lebel was born in Calgary, Alberta and raised in Vancouver, British Columbia. She went on to study singing at the University of Toronto and the Université de Montréal. Following her studies she received grants from the Canada Council for the Arts and the Jacqueline Desmarais Foundation for Young Canadian Opera and was awarded a place on the Opéra de Montréal's Atelier Lyrique artist-in-residence program. She was a prize winner in Canada's Jeunes Ambassadeurs Lyriques Competition, and was subsequently offered a position in the Theater Erfurt's ensemble in Thuringia, Germany in 2009. Since leaving Theater Erfurt in 2014, she has been making critically successful debuts with opera companies and orchestras across Europe and North America.

She notably performed as a soloist on the Boston Early Music Festival's 2015 Grammy Award winning recording of Charpentier’s La descente d'Orphée aux enfers. Lebel has also appeared in the Czech Republic with the Prague State Opera, in France with the Aix-en-Provence Festival, in the USA with the Houston Symphony Orchestra, and in Canada with Toronto's Opera Atelier and Tafelmusik, Quebec's Les Violons du Roy, and the Vancouver Opera, amongst others. Her performances have included the title roles in Bizet's Carmen, Rossini's La Cenerentola (Cinderella), and Gluck/Berlioz's Orphée et Eurydice, along with Cherubino in Mozart's Le nozze di Figaro (The Marriage of Figaro), and Sesto in Mozart’s La Clemenza di Tito (The Clemency of Titus), plus roles in contemporary operas such as Ana Sokolovic's Svadba (Marriage) and Hèctor Parra's Wilde.

Lebel sustained a serious burn injury in 2018 during the rehearsal period for Monteverdi’s Il ritorno d’Ulisse in patria with Opera Atelier in Toronto. Following several surgeries at the Ross Tilley Burn Center at Sunnybrook Hospital, she managed to sing the entire run of the opera.

Discography 
Album Appearances
2018 Philharmonisches Orchester Erfurt – Alois Broeder’s Die Frauen der Toten (Dreyer Gaido)
2014 Boston Early Music Festival - Marc-Antoine Charpentier’s La Descente d’Orphée aux Enfers and La Couronne de Fleurs (Classic Produktion Osnabrück)
2011 Boston Early Music Festival – John Blow’s Venus and Adonis (Classic Produktion Osnabrück)
2010 Boston Early Music Festival – Marc-Antoine Charpentier’s Actéon (Classic Produktion Osnabrück)
2008 Boston Early Music Festival – Jean-Baptiste Lully’s Pscyhé (Classic Produktion Osnabrück)
2007 Boston Early Music Festival – Jean-Baptiste Lully’s Thésée (Classic Produktion Osnabrück)

References

External links 
 Mireille Lebel Official Site

Living people
Year of birth missing (living people)
Canadian mezzo-sopranos
Musicians from Calgary
University of Toronto alumni
Université de Montréal alumni
Canadian operatic sopranos